The Clerk of the New York State Assembly heads the administration of the New York State Assembly. The outgoing clerk of the previous session presides over a new Assembly until a Speaker is elected. Subsequently a clerk is elected by the members of the Assembly. The clerk is the nominal author of the Assembly's legislative journals. The clerk appoints most of the Assembly's employees, like deputy clerks, assistant clerks, committee clerks, pages and janitors. Many clerks have been elected members of the Assembly, either before or after their clerkships.

List

Notes

Sources
 New York Red Book (2005–2006; pg. 411)

1777 establishments in New York (state)